Glynde Place is an Elizabethan Manor House at Glynde in East Sussex, England. Situated in the South Downs National Park, it is the family home of the Viscounts Hampden, whose forebears built the house in 1569. It is a Grade I listed building. The adjacent church was built in the eighteenth century.

(Total  worth £24,753 a year).

From 2008 - 2013, the house was subject to a major renovation, organised by the 7th Viscount Hampden, and funded by the sale of one of the estate's paintings.  

The house and gardens, the latter being Grade II* listed, are open to the public for tours.

Events
From 2010 to 2013, the Meadowlands Festival was held in the grounds. Since 2013, it is the site of the Love Supreme Jazz Festival, which takes place every summer.

References

External links
 Glynde Place

Houses completed in 1569
Grade I listed buildings in East Sussex
Country houses in East Sussex
Gardens in East Sussex
Historic house museums in East Sussex
1569 establishments in England
Place